Suriname competed at the 2012 Summer Olympics in London, from 27 July to 12 August 2012. This was the nation's twelfth appearance at the Olympics.

Five Surinamese athletes, three men and two women, were selected to the team, competing only in track and field, badminton, and swimming. All of them received their spots by wild card entries, without having qualified. Freestyle swimmer Chinyere Pigot, an accounting student at the University of Connecticut, was Suriname's flag bearer at the opening ceremony.

Athletics

Suriname has selected 2 athletes by a wildcard.

Key
 Note – Ranks given for track events are within the athlete's heat only
 Q = Qualified for the next round
 q = Qualified for the next round as a fastest loser or, in field events, by position without achieving the qualifying target
 NR = National record
 N/A = Round not applicable for the event
 Bye = Athlete not required to compete in round

Men

Women

Badminton

Suriname was given a wild card.

Swimming

Men

Women

References

Nations at the 2012 Summer Olympics
2012
2012 in Surinamese sport